Mohamed Richard Bakary (born 17 October 1997 in Porto-Novo, Benin) is a footballer who plays as a defender for A.F.C. Totton.

Career

Club career
Having started his career as an attacking player he signed for Chelsea before Southampton swooped and converted him to a defensive player during his 4 years with club. But at the end of the 2017–18 season, his contract with Southampton was not renewed. He made no first team appearances for the club but made many appearances for the U23’s before his release.

On 5 September 2019, Bakary joined A.F.C. Totton.

International career
He represented Benin in a friendly match against Mauritania on 24 March 2017.

References

External links
 Richard Bakary - Southampton FC

1997 births
Living people
People from Porto-Novo
Beninese footballers
Benin international footballers
Beninese expatriate footballers
Beninese expatriate sportspeople in England
Association football defenders
A.F.C. Totton players